History of Rochester may refer to:

 History of Rochester, Kent, England
 History of Rochester, New York, USA